New Yorkers for Constitutional Freedoms is a non-profit Christian conservative political advocacy group in the State of New York.  The organization was founded in 1982. As of January 2018, Rev. Jason J. McGuire is the organization's Executive Director.  NYCF's educational arm, New Yorker's Family Research Foundation, was formed in 1990.

NYCF was active in opposition to same-sex marriage in New York, which was legalized by the Marriage Equality Act in 2011. After the Act was passed, NYCF set up a "Courage Fund" to "assist courageous municipal clerks and other people of conscience in New York State who oppose same-sex 'marriage' from harassment, denial of rightful promotion, or unfair termination for invoking New York State law protecting their sincerely-held religious beliefs." After Barker town clerk Laura Fotusky resigned rather than be forced to sign same-sex marriage licenses, NYCF pledged to match the $25,000 salary she gave up in resigning.

On July 25, 2011, NYCF filed a lawsuit against the New York Senate in the New York Supreme Court seeking an injunction against the law which had taken effect a day earlier, alleging violations of the law in the process by which the bill was passed. Rev. McGuire, Rev. Duane Motley (NYCF's senior lobbyist), and Rabbi Nathaniel Leiter (executive director of the Orthodox Jewish organization Torah Jews for Decency) were named as plaintiffs in the lawsuit. On November 18, 2011, Acting Supreme Court Justice Robert B. Wiggins allowed the plaintiffs' claims under the Open Meetings Law, but dismissed other portions of the case. On July 6, 2012, a five-judge panel of the Appellate Division ruled unanimously that no violation of the Open Meetings Law had occurred and dismissed the suit. The New York Court of Appeals, the state's highest court, declined to hear an appeal in the case on October 23, 2012.

See also

References

External links
 Official site

Political advocacy groups in the United States
Conservative organizations in the United States